KirtiKumar Mitesh Bhangdiya better known as Bunty Bhangdiya is a member of the 13th Maharashtra Legislative Assembly. He represents the Chimur Assembly Constituency. He belongs to the Bharatiya Janata Party (BJP). He was the richest candidate from Vidarbha in the 2014 elections. Bhangdiya was founder and head of "Yuvashakti Sanghatna" a political organisation that held power in the Gadchiroli Zilla Parishad in 2014. In August 2014, Bhangdiya joined the BJP. He was the first BJP candidate to win from Chimur. In 2014 state election he won by margin of 25,155 votes by defeating the Congress candidate. In 2019 he again won from Chimur. He is known to be very close to Devendra Fadnavis. He was amongst the top 10 most working MLAs in Maharashtra.

Bhangdiya's father Mitesh Bhangdiya is a member of Maharashtra Legislative Council, from the  Chandrapur- Gadchiroli- Wardha local body constituency (2012-2018) who also belongs to the BJP. Mitesh Bhangdiya is amongst the leading irrigation contractors in the Vidarbha-Marathwada region.

On 21 August 2017, Bhangdiya and several of his supporters were charged with assaulting an Indian National Congress leader and several of his own supporters in Chandrapur.

References

Maharashtra MLAs 2014–2019
Bharatiya Janata Party politicians from Maharashtra
Living people
People from Chandrapur district
Marathi politicians
Year of birth missing (living people)